Charley Brewer (March 8, 1873 – June 13, 1958) was an American football player.  Brewer attended Harvard University, where he played for the Harvard Crimson football team.  He was recognized as a consensus first-team All-American three times at the fullback position – in 1892, 1893, 1895, and was inducted into the College Football Hall of Fame in 1971. 

1873 births
1958 deaths
Players of American football from Honolulu
19th-century players of American football
American football fullbacks
American football drop kickers
Harvard Crimson football players
All-American college football players
College Football Hall of Fame inductees